Gericke is a surname. Notable people with the surname include:

Arne Gericke (born 1964), German politician
Frederick Gericke (born 1967) American born Curator of obscure knowledge, Jack of all trades
Carla Gericke (born 1972), American writer, activist, and former lawyer born in South Africa
Hans Gericke (1912–2014), German architect and urban planner
Helmuth Gericke (1909–2007), German mathematician
Hermann Gericke (born 1931), Swiss swimmer
Lisa Sophie Gericke (born 1995), German bobsledder
Lothar Gericke (born 1950), German swimmer
Michael Gericke (born 1956), American graphic designer
Samuel Theodor Gericke (1665-1730), German painter
Shane Gericke, American novelist
Walter Gericke (1907–1991), German paratroop officer in the Luftwaffe of Nazi Germany
Wilhelm Gericke (1845–1925), Austrian-born conductor and composer
William Frederick Gericke (1882–1970), American botanist, pioneer of hydroponics
Surnames from given names